is a Japanese professional boxer who held the WBO flyweight title from 2017 to 2018.

Professional career

WBO Asia Pacific Title
on Nov 23, 2016, Kimura defeated Masahiro Sakamoto to win the WBO Asia Pacific flyweight title.

WBO World Title
On July 28, 2017, Sho Kimura defeated Zou Shiming by 11th-round knockout to win the title in Shanghai Oriental Sports Center, Shanghai, China.  Kimura entered the fight ranked number 7 by the WBO.  He entered the fight as a 10-1 underdog.  The fight was promoted by Zou with an entirely new training and management team.

Professional boxing record

Personal life 
Sho Kimura was born in Kumagaya, Saitama, Japan. And currently resides in Shinjuku, Tokyo, Japan. Kimura has one brother and his mother died at the age of 44. At the press conference after the WBO flyweight title fight, Kimura admitted that the big driving factor was his mother. The fighter stated that he was determined to take the title to his mother's grave, as he did with the WBO Asia Pacific title when he won that last year. It's clear that this is a personal mission for him and something that really is a driving factor with his career going forward.

Before winning the WBO flyweight title, Kimura had been working as a deliveryman in Tokyo and was under extreme financial pressure - a hardship experienced by many boxers in the early stages of their career. During this period, Kimura only had time for training in the evenings.

See also
List of flyweight boxing champions
List of Japanese boxing world champions

References

External links

1988 births
Living people
Flyweight boxers
World flyweight boxing champions
World Boxing Organization champions
Japanese male boxers
Sportspeople from Saitama Prefecture
21st-century Japanese people